Ivankovo is a rural locality (a village) in Chertkovskoye Rural Settlement, Selivanovsky District, Vladimir Oblast, Russia. The population was 57 as of 2010.

Geography 
The village is located on the Motra River, 5 km north from Chertkovo, 25 km north-east from Krasnaya Gorbatka.

References 

Rural localities in Selivanovsky District